Romar Entertainment was a California-based film distribution company founded in 2003 by James Schramm and partnered with Billy Zane in 2005.

Lawsuit

In 2008 the company was sued by film maker Uwe Boll, in which Boll claimed Romar had failed to properly promote his 2005 film BloodRayne, resulting in its poor box-office performance.

Filmography

Distribution
Ancient Warriors (2003)
Vlad (2003)
Fish Without a Bicycle (2003)
The Helix...Loaded (2005)
BloodRayne (2005)

Production
No Names (2007)

References

External links

Romar Entertainment at IMDb

Film production companies of the United States